Nothobranchius korthausae is a species of killifish in the family Nothobranchiidae. It is endemic to Mafia Island in Tanzania.  Its natural habitat is pools, ditches and small streams. The specific name of this species honours the German aquarist Edith Korthaus who collected the type.

References

korthausae
Fish of Tanzania
Endemic fauna of Tanzania
Taxonomy articles created by Polbot
Fish described in 1973